Plant Ecology is a scientific journal on plant ecology, formerly known as Vegetatio, a journal whose editors resigned in protest of high pricing. The journal publishes original scientific papers on the ecology of vascular plants and terrestrial and aquatic ecosystems. The editor-in-chief is Neal J. Enright (Murdoch University).

Abstracting and indexing
The journal is abstracted and indexed in Academic OneFile, AGRICOLA, ASFA, Biological Abstracts, BIOSIS, CAB Abstracts, CAB International, ProQuest, Current Contents/Agriculture, Biology & Environmental Sciences, Geobase, Global Health, Science Citation Index, Scopus, and Summon by Serial Solutions. According to the Journal Citation Reports, the journal's 2011 impact factor is 1.829.

References

External links
 
 Journals declaring independence http://oad.simmons.edu/oadwiki/Journal_declarations_of_independence

Ecology journals
Botany journals
Monthly journals
Springer Science+Business Media academic journals
English-language journals
Publications established in 1948
Forestry journals